Preußenstadion is a multi-use stadium in Münster, Germany. It is used as the stadium of SC Preußen Münster matches. The capacity of the stadium is 14,300 spectators. The record attendance for a match of Preußen Münster at the venue is around 40,000.

References

External links 
 Stadium history

Football venues in Germany
Buildings and structures in Münster
Sports venues in North Rhine-Westphalia
SC Preußen Münster
Sports venues completed in 1926